Judex  is a 1963 French-language  crime film remake of the 1916 French film serial of the same name concerning the adventures of pulp hero Judex. Directed by French filmmaker Georges Franju, the film stars Channing Pollock as Judex/Vallieres, Édith Scob as Jacqueline and Francine Bergé as Diana.

Plot

The film's plot largely follows the arc of Louis Feuillade's serial, but necessarily cuts down the number of events and characters to fit its feature-length running time.

Franju's film begins with Favraux (Michel Vitold), a corrupt banker, and his secretary Vallieres discussing an apparent blackmail note signed only "Judex" (meaning "judge" or "upholder of the law").  Favraux is puzzled because the note demands only that he return money that he has embezzled from others.  He hires Cocantin (Jacques Jouanneau), a detective, to provide security at a party he  will be giving to announce the engagement of his daughter Jacqueline (Édith Scob), a young widow with a daughter, to an aged but wealthy man.  Another man, Pierre Kerjean (René Génin), suddenly comes in and demands aid from Favraux, for whom he had served time in prison, but Favraux has Vallieres escort him from the room.

Later, Cocantin reports that Kerjean has died after being found on the street.  Favraux receives another warning from Judex, which he takes more seriously.  In the meantime, though, he tells Marie Verdier (Francine Bergé), Jacqueline's governess, that he is infatuated with her and must marry her after Jacqueline's wedding.  That night at the party, where everyone is masked, a mysterious guest wearing  a bird's head performs magic tricks.  When Favraux begins to announce the engagement, though, he collapses, apparently dead.  Later, we see that Judex, who appears in a black hat and cloak, and his assistants have removed Favraux, who was only drugged, from his coffin and imprisoned him.

After Favraux's supposed  funeral, Cocantin shows Jacqueline the letter from Judex, which vowed that vengeance would come to Favraux at the exact time when he died.  Jacqueline wants to go to the police, but Vallieres tells her about her father's crooked past.  Jacqueline renounces any money that she would inherit except for a portion for her daughter, whom she has sent off.  The former governess turns out actually to be Diana Monti, head of a criminal gang, who still wants access to Favraux's fortune.  Diana adopts other roles and disguises in a series of tricks and attacks to kidnap Jacqueline, who is rescued several times by Judex.  Later, Diana also tries to abduct Jacqueline's daughter, but is again foiled, party through actions by the detective Cocantin and his son.  Finally, Diana is isolated on a rooftop and, in a battle with a circus gymnast (Sylva Koscina) aiding the heroes, falls to her death.

At the end Judex and Jacqueline are reunited, walking on a beach as a title appears: "“In homage to Louis Feuillade, in memory of a time that was not happy: 1914.”

Cast
 Channing Pollock as Judex/Vallieres
 Édith Scob as Jacqueline
 Francine Bergé as Diana 
 Théo Sarapo as Morales
 Sylva Koscina as Daisy
 René Génin as Pierre Kerjean
 Michel Vitold as the Banker Favraux

Production

Development
The production of Judex happened by chance. French writer Francis Lacassin was writing an article on French film, and while doing research he was approached by a production manager with an idea for a film, when he suggested to do a film on Judex. The story came to Jacques Champreux who's the grandson of the original creator of Judex, Louis Feuillade. 
Jacques Champreux has been a fan of director Georges Franju and asked him to make the film, who accepted despite having a larger desire to remake Fantômas. Georges Franju was not very interested in the character or original story of Judex, stating that "Judex is the only film of Louis Feuillade that isn't good Louis Feuillade," but he wanted to recreate the film in the style of early French cinema that he remembered from his childhood. Jacques Champreux's idea for the film was to combine Georges Franju's film style with the elements of the story in the original Judex and started writing the screenplay with that in mind. Jacques Champreux and Georges Franju had the film open with a costume ball where everyone is wearing animal masks. This scene is influenced by French cartoonist J.J. Grandville, who depicted people with the heads of animals and birds.

Casting
Channing Pollock, who was a famous conjurer in cabaret circles, was cast as Judex. Pollock had been in several films beforehand and the backing producers wanted to make him into a Rudolph Valentino-type star. Georges Franju and Jacques Champreux made his character into more of a magical character rather than a "dispenser of justice". Many actresses were thought of for the role of Diana Monti, originally played by Musidora in the Feuillade's Judex. Franju and Champreaux wanted someone who would "still look good even in the dark" and originally desired to have Brigitte Bardot as Diana Monti which excited their producers. After seeing Les Abysses at the Cannes Film Festival, they chose Francine Bergé who also played the role of Michele in the film. Franju cast Édith Scob as Jacqueline who he had worked with on his previous films, including Eyes Without a Face and Thérèse Desqueyroux.

Release and reception
Judex was released on December 4, 1963, in France. The general reception for the French critics of Judex was fairly positive, with most critics applauded the homage to the original silent film serial while noting the problems that arose when with the over-conscientious approach to style and atmosphere. A critic from L'Express wrote that the film was "pure entertainment, pure charm, a total success". while another from Les Nouvelles littéraires called the film's pacing "lazy" and the film direction "nonchalant, not to say laborious". Claude Mauriac of Le Figaro littéraire wrote that the film did not let the audience relate to the action as it was too caught up attracting them to the "plastic beauty" of the film. The film opened up to generally positive review in the United States as well. Variety wrote a positive review stating that the film was "...a successful homage to the French film serials of the early, silent days...[the film] does not send up this form of pic but rather captures its essential simplicity, adventurousness and innocence." Time also wrote a positive review stating "Judex has too much low-key charm and seriousness to be wildly funny, but Director Franju seems content to woo a minority taste." The New York Times wrote a negative review, stating that Judex "suffers from several afflictions, one of which is ambiguity. It is hard to tell whether Georges Franju, who made it, wants us to laugh at it or take it seriously."

Modern reception has been generally positive. Jonathan Rosenbaum of the Chicago Reader wrote that Judex was "one of the better features of [Franju's] middle period". Time Out wrote that the film is "superbly elegant" and an "enjoyable tribute to the adventure fantasies of Louis Feuillade".

Home media
A Region 2 release of Judex was released on August 25, 2008, by Eureka in their Masters of Cinema series. This release also included the 1973 film Nuits Rouges also directed by Georges Franju.

References

Bibliography

 Ince, Kate. Georges Franju. Manchester University Press, 2005. .

External links
 
 
 
 
The Secret Heart of Judex an essay by Geoffrey O’Brien at the Criterion Collection

1963 films
1960s French-language films
French black-and-white films
1960s crime thriller films
French crime films
Italian crime films
Remakes of French films
Sound film remakes of silent films
Films directed by Georges Franju
Films scored by Maurice Jarre
1960s Italian films
1960s French films